Pannie Pantea Kianzad (born December 8, 1991, in Ahvaz, Iran) is an Iranian-born Swedish mixed martial artist. She is currently signed by Ultimate Fighting Championship in the Women's Bantamweight division, having previously fought in Invicta FC and Cage Warriors where she held the bantamweight title. As of October 3, 2022, she is #7 in the UFC women's bantamweight rankings.

Mixed martial arts career

Early career
Kianzad started her martial arts career in boxing when she was around 14 years old and she went on to compete in around 30 amateur boxing fights. In 2010, she competed in the Swedish National Championships in Shootfighting and came in second place claiming the silver medal after losing to Lina Länsberg in the final. The following year, at 19 years of age, she became Swedish Champion in Shootfighting by defeating Genesini Serena by submission (armbar) in the second round.

After turning professional in MMA she avenged her loss against Lina Länsberg in her third fight, which she won by TKO. She racked up five straight wins in smaller organizations before getting signed to Cage Warriors. During this period she transitioned from team Kaisho in Helsingborg, Sweden, to Rumble Sports in Copenhagen, Denmark. As of 2016 Kianzad trains with Arte Suave team in Copenhagen, Denmark

Cage Warriors
In 2014 Kianzad signed with British top promotion Cage Warriors. She made her promotional debut against Megan van Houtum on August 22, 2014, at Cage Warriors 71. She won the fight by TKO in the third round.

Kianzad was expected to face Agnieszka Niedzwiedz for the vacant bantamweight title on November 15, 2014, at Cage Warriors 74, but Niedzwiedz was forced to withdraw from the bout due to an injury and Kianzad's opponent was changed to be Finnish fighter Eeva Siiskonen. After five rounds Kianzad defeated Siiskonen by unanimous decision (50–45, 50–45, 49–46) to become Cage Warriors female bantamweight champion.

Invicta Fighting Championship
After staying undefeated through her first 7 fights, and claiming the Cage Warriors title, Kianzad got another step up in her career as she got signed by Invicta FC in March, 2015.

She made her promotional debut against Jessica-Rose Clark on July 9, 2015, at Invicta FC 13. Kianzad won the fight by one-sided unanimous decision.

Kianzad was set to face newly crowned champion Tonya Evinger in a title fight on September 14, 2015, at Invicta FC 14. However, Kianzad missed weight for the fight so it was changed to a non-title bout. She lost by TKO in the second round.

She fought Raquel Pa'aluhi on January 14, 2017, at Invicta FC 21. She lost the fight by submission due to a rear-naked choke in the first round.

Kianzad faced Sarah Kaufman on January 13, 2018, at Invicta FC 27. At weight-ins, Kianzad weighted 136.7 Ibs, missing 0.7 Ibs of the upper limit in bantamweight of 136 Ibs. Kianzad was fined twenty five percent of her fight purse for missing weight. She lost the fight via unanimous decision.

Kianzad fought Bianca Daimoni on May 4, 2018, at Invicta FC 29. At weight-ins, Kianzad weighted 134.8 lbs while Daimoni weighted 139.6, missing 3.6 lbs of the upper limit in bantamweight of 136 lbs and the bout proceeded at catchweight. Daimoni was fined twenty five percent of her fight purse for missing weight  Kianzad won the fight via unanimous decision.

About a month later she fought Kerry Hughes on June 9, 2018, at Danish MMA Night 1. Kianzad had a dominant performance and won by unanimous decision.

The Ultimate Fighter 28 
In August 2018 Kianzad's sponsor Combat Dollies revealed that she had been selected as a fighter on The Ultimate Fighter 28, where she would compete at featherweight.

Kianzad was the fourth pick (second among featherweights) by coach Kelvin Gastelum. She fought Katharina Lehner in the quarter-finals of the tournament. She won the fight by unanimous decision.

In the semi-finals of the tournament, Kianzad was paired up against Julija Stoliarenko. She won the fight by unanimous decision, securing a spot in the finals.

Ultimate Fighting Championship
Kianzad faced Macy Chiasson in the finals on November 30, 2018, at The Ultimate Fighter 28 Finale. She lost the fight via a rear-naked choke submission in round two.

Kianzad did not receive a contract from UFC after her loss at TUF 28 Finale.

Post-UFC career
In her return to the European scene, Kianzad dropped back down to the bantamweight division and faced Bellator veteran Iony Razafiarison on May 11, 2019, at Super Challenge 19. She won the fight by unanimous decision.

Return to Ultimate Fighting Championship
Kianzad replaced Melissa Gatto in a short notice bout against Julia Avila on July 6, 2019, at UFC 239. She lost the fight by unanimous decision.

Kianzad faced Jessica-Rose Clark in a re-match on November 9, 2019, at UFC Fight Night 163. She won the fight via unanimous decision.

Kianzad was scheduled to face Bethe Correia on May 9, 2020, at UFC 249. However, on April 9, Dana White, the president of UFC announced that this event was postponed to a future date The bout eventually took place on July 26, 2020, at UFC on ESPN 14. Kianzad won the fight via unanimous decision. Kianzad entered the UFC rankings for the first time in her career after her win over #13 ranked Correia.

Kianzad faced Sijara Eubanks on December 19, 2020, at UFC Fight Night 183. She won the fight via unanimous decision.

Kianzad faced on Alexis Davis June 12, 2021 at UFC 263. She won the fight via unanimous decision.

Kianzad faced Raquel Pennington on September 18, 2021, at UFC Fight Night 192. She lost the fight via unanimous decision.

Kianzad faced Lina Länsberg on April 16, 2022 at UFC on ESPN 34. She won the fight via unanimous decision.

Championships and accomplishments

Mixed martial arts
Ultimate Fighting Championship
The Ultimate Fighter 28 (Runner-Up)
Invicta Fighting Championships
Performance of the Night (One time) vs. Bianca Daimoni
Cage Warriors Fighting Championship
CWFC Women's Bantamweight Championship (One time)
Undefeated in the CWFC (2-0)
Nordic MMA Awards - MMAViking.com
2013 Female Fighter of the Year
2018 Female Fighter of the Year
2020 Female Fighter of the Year

Shootfighting
Swedish Shootfighting League
2010 National Women's Featherweight Shootfighting Championship 
2011 National Women's Featherweight Shootfighting Championship

Mixed martial arts record

|-
|Win
|align=center|16–6
|Lina Länsberg
|Decision (unanimous)
|UFC on ESPN: Luque vs. Muhammad 2 
|
|align=center|3
|align=center|5:00
|Las Vegas, Nevada, United States
|
|-
|Loss
|align=center|15–6
|Raquel Pennington
|Decision (unanimous)
|UFC Fight Night: Smith vs. Spann 
|
|align=center|3
|align=center|5:00
|Las Vegas, Nevada, United States
|
|-
|Win
|align=center|15–5
|Alexis Davis
|Decision (unanimous)
|UFC 263 
|
|align=center|3
|align=center|5:00
|Glendale, Arizona, United States
|
|-
|Win
|align=center|14–5
|Sijara Eubanks
|Decision (unanimous)
|UFC Fight Night: Thompson vs. Neal
|
|align=center|3
|align=center|5:00
|Las Vegas, Nevada, United States
|
|-
|Win
|align=center|13–5
|Bethe Correia
|Decision (unanimous)
|UFC on ESPN: Whittaker vs. Till 
|
|align=center|3
|align=center|5:00
|Abu Dhabi, United Arab Emirates
|
|-
|-
|Win
|align=center|12–5
|Jessica-Rose Clark
|Decision (unanimous)
|UFC Fight Night: Magomedsharipov vs. Kattar 
|
|align=center|3
|align=center|5:00
|Moscow, Russia
| 
|-
|Loss
|align=center|11–5
|Julia Avila
|Decision (unanimous)
|UFC 239 
|
|align=center|3
|align=center|5:00
|Las Vegas, Nevada, United States
|
|- 
|Win
|align=center|11–4
|Iony Razafiarison
|Decision (unanimous)
|Superior Challenge 19
|
|align=center|3
|align=center|5:00
|Stockholm, Sweden 
|
|-
|Loss
|align=center|10–4
|Macy Chiasson
|Submission (rear-naked choke)
|The Ultimate Fighter: Heavy Hitters Finale 
|
|align=center|2
|align=center|2:11
|Las Vegas, Nevada, United States
|
|- 
|Win
|align=center|10–3
|Kerry Hughes
|Decision (unanimous)
|Danish MMA Night: Vol. 1
|
|align=center|3
|align=center|5:00
|Brøndby, Denmark
|
|-
| Win
|align=center|9–3
|Bianca Daimoni
|Decision (unanimous)
|Invicta FC 29: Kaufman vs. Lehner
|
|align=center|3
|align=center|5:00
|Kansas City, Missouri, United States
|
|-
| Loss
|align=center|8–3
|Sarah Kaufman
|Decision (unanimous)
|Invicta FC 27: Kaufman vs. Kianzad
|
|align=center|3
|align=center|5:00
|Kansas City, Missouri, United States
|
|-
| Loss
|align=center|8–2
|Raquel Pa'aluhi
|Submission (rear-naked choke)
|Invicta FC 21: Anderson vs. Tweet
|
|align=center|1
|align=center|3:40
|Kansas City, Missouri, United States
|
|-
| Loss
|align=center|8–1
|Tonya Evinger
|TKO (punches)
|Invicta FC 14: Evinger vs. Kianzad
|
|align=center|2
|align=center|3:34
|Kansas City, Kansas, United States
|
|-
|Win
|align=center|8–0
|Jessica-Rose Clark
|Decision (unanimous)
|Invicta FC 13: Cyborg vs. Van Duin
|
|align=center|3
|align=center|5:00
|Las Vegas, Nevada, United States
| 
|-
|Win
|align=center|7–0
|Eeva Siiskonen
|Decision (unanimous)
|Cage Warriors FC 74
|
|align=center|5
|align=center|5:00
|London, England
|
|-
|Win
|align=center|6–0
|Megan van Houtum
|TKO (punches)
|Cage Warriors FC 71
|
|align=center|3
|align=center|2:17
|Amman, Jordan
|
|-
|Win
|align=center|5–0
|Annalisa Bucci
|Decision (unanimous)
|Superior Challenge 10
|
|align=center|3
|align=center|5:00
|Helsingborg, Sweden
|
|-
|Win
|align=center|4–0
|Milana Dudieva
|Decision (unanimous)
|ProFC 50
|
|align=center|3
|align=center|5:00
|Rostov-on-Don, Russia
|
|-
|Win
|align=center|3–0
|Lina Länsberg
|TKO (punches)
|Trophy MMA 1
|
|align=center|3
|align=center|4:44
|Malmö, Sweden
|
|-
|Win
|align=center|2–0
|Cheryl Flynn
|TKO (punches)
|Vision FC 5: Finale
|
|align=center|1
|align=center|2:50
|Stockholm, Sweden
|
|-
|Win
|align=center|1–0
|Helin Paara
|Decision (unanimous)
|MMA Raju 9
|
|align=center|3
|align=center|4:00
|Tallinn, Estonia
|
|-

|-
|Win
|align=center|2–0
| Julija Stoliarenko
| Decision (unanimous)
| rowspan=2|The Ultimate Fighter: Heavy Hitters
| (airdate)
|align=center|3
|align=center|5:00
| rowspan=2|Las Vegas, Nevada, United States
|
|-
|Win
|align=center|1–0
| Katharina Lehner
| Decision (unanimous)
| (airdate)
|align=center|2
|align=center|5:00
|
|-

References

External links
 
 

1991 births
People from Ahvaz
Living people
Swedish female mixed martial artists
Iranian female mixed martial artists
Swedish practitioners of Brazilian jiu-jitsu
Iranian practitioners of Brazilian jiu-jitsu
Female Brazilian jiu-jitsu practitioners
Bantamweight mixed martial artists
Mixed martial artists utilizing boxing
Mixed martial artists utilizing shootfighting
Mixed martial artists utilizing Brazilian jiu-jitsu
Iranian emigrants to Sweden
Sportspeople of Iranian descent
Ultimate Fighting Championship female fighters
Sportspeople from Khuzestan province